Christmas Is A Comin' is a Christmas album by Pat Boone, released in 1966 on Dot Records.

Billboard picked the album for its "Spotlight" section. "The opener "Christmas Is A Comin" is a sparkler and then [Boone] adds a fresh touch to such favorites as "Winter Wonderland" and "Do You Hear What I Hear," says the magazine.

Track listing

References 

1966 albums
Pat Boone albums
Dot Records albums
Pop Christmas albums